is a former Japanese professional baseball pitcher and currently development coach for the Tohoku Rakuten Golden Eagles of the Nippon Professional Baseball (NPB).

On October 14, 2019, Nagai become development coach for the Tohoku Rakuten Golden Eagles of NPB.

References

External links

1984 births
Baseball people from Gunma Prefecture
Living people
Japanese baseball coaches
Honolulu Sharks players
Japanese expatriate baseball players in the United States
Nippon Professional Baseball coaches
Nippon Professional Baseball pitchers
Tohoku Rakuten Golden Eagles players
Toyo University alumni